Durave or Durava or Durawa  are a southern coastal Sinhalese caste in Sri Lanka. Their traditional occupation is toddy tapping. They trace their ancestry to medieval period migrants from South India. The term Durave arise from Tamil word Duraivan (துறைவன்) means person belongs to port region. The caste of Duraivan still exist in the district of Kanyakumari in Tamil Nadu where they indulge in fishing, toddy taping and trade.

Current status
They were converted to Catholic religion soon after arrival of Portuguese colonials in 1505 ACE. Using this opportunity they have upgraded themselves in relation to the dominant Govigama caste.

They along with other southern Sinhalese castes such as Karave  and Salagama have played an important role in the historically left political and right parties. They are mostly Theravada Buddhists today and were instrumental in the revival of Buddhism during the British colonial period. The un-Buddhistic practice of caste discrimination introduced into the Sangha by the Siyam Nikaya in the late 18th century has been overcome by patronising the Amarapura Nikaya and the Ramanna Nikayas. Sitinamaluwe Dhammajoti (Durawa) was the last nongovigama monk to receive upasampada before the 1764 conspiracy.

References

Further reading 
  Bryce Ryan, Caste in Modern Ceylon, Rutgers University Press, 1953.

Sinhalese castes
Brewing and distilling castes